The 1995 Senior League World Series took place from August 13–19 in Kissimmee, Florida, United States. Dunedin, Florida defeated Clarksville, Indiana in the championship game. It was Florida's second straight championship.

Teams

Results

Winner's Bracket

Loser's Bracket

Placement Bracket

Elimination Round

References

Senior League World Series
Senior League World Series
1995 in sports in Florida